Ctenosia albiceps is a moth of the subfamily Arctiinae. It was described by George Hampson in 1901. It is found on the Bacan Islands in Indonesia.

References

Lithosiini
Moths described in 1901